Alexander Russell Frater (3 January 1937 – 1 January 2020) was a British travel writer and journalist. Described by Miles Kington as 'the funniest man who wrote for Punch since the war', Frater is best known for his various books and for documentaries he wrote and produced for the BBC and ABC.

Early life
Frater was born in a small mission hospital in Port Vila, Vanuatu, in the middle of a monsoon. His grandfather and his father were Scottish Presbyterian missionaries in Vanuatu. His grandfather Maurice was based on the island of Paama, which had previously been hostile to all outsiders, from 1900-1939. His father Alec, who became a doctor, established a hospital on the island of Iririki, offshore from Parliament House in Port Vila, training local staff in the treatment of tropical diseases. His mother established and ran two schools in Vanuatu. His father would later teach him how to observe and analyse weather. Frater's family employed the services of a native gardener, Moses, who believed the young Alexander was the reincarnation of a rain God. A few weeks after the attack on Pearl Harbor, the family evacuated to Australia to escape the coming war. In 1946 they moved to Suva, Fiji, where Frater Sr. became professor at the Central Medical School.

After primary school Frater was sent back to Australia to attend Scotch College in Melbourne, where he edited the school magazine and, as head boy, succeeded in his campaign to abolish corporal punishment. Initially studying law at the University of Melbourne, he left before graduating to move to England, and studied English at Durham University (Hatfield College). From 1960-1962 Frater competed for Durham University Boat Club. He also represented the Hatfield College Boat Club in intercollegiate events, and served as Captain of the Hatfield College Swimming Club in 1961.

He stumbled into a journalism career by accident. Having submitted pieces to Punch while still an undergraduate at Durham he was, against all expectations, eventually offered a staff job, which prompted him to once again leave university without graduating. Frater would later enroll at Perugia University to briefly study Italian, before again dropping out, meaning that he had attended three universities without graduating from any of them – an 'unusual feat' of which he was proud. While in Italy he met his wife, Marlis Pfund, who worked as an air hostess for Swissair.

Career

Punch
Before making his living through writing Frater had romanticised about joining the Colonial Service, but the process of decolonization, culminating in the end of the Colonial Office altogether, ended this notion. Frater's tenure at Punch saw him develop a friendly rivalry with a young Alan Coren, later to find fame as a humourist and participant on The News Quiz. But it also coincided with the magazine's period of starkest decline, which he attributed to both the Satire boom (which left Punch looking old-fashioned) and the decline of the British Empire – the magazine being popular in the Colonies.

Interim
Looking to move on, he soon became a contracted writer for The New Yorker. During his time writing for The New Yorker he produced a number of stories about an idyllic, imaginary Pacific island he called Tofua. Later he was informed by a fact-checker that such an island really existed in Tonga, which went on to form the basis for a book published many years later, Tales from the Torrid Zone. Following his time with The New Yorker he spent one year as a staff writer for The Daily Telegraph from 1966–1967, working on its supplemental magazine. John Anstey, the magazine's editor, did not like 'Russ', the name which Frater was then known by and demanded he use his first name for his byline (his family had a tradition of calling members by their second names). Friends from earlier periods would continue to call him 'Russ', as did those he met after leaving Fleet Street.

The Observer
Frater moved to The Observer in 1967, where he would spend more than two decades, become travel editor and amass a series of awards. He was twice commended in the British Press Awards, and in 1990 won Travel Writer of the Year.

Frater took a short break from journalism to write Beyond the Blue Horizon (1984). He attempted to recreate the journey made in the Imperial Airways 'Eastbound Empire' service - the world's longest and most adventurous scheduled air route. Chasing the Monsoon (1990) sees Frater follow the Monsoon in India. As a child his curiosity about India, and particularly its monsoon season, was sparked by his father - who often told stories about the country. In the course of this journey following the Monsoon he visited the city of Deeg, having driven for five-hours from New Delhi, but was disappointed to find the city largely lifeless and the watercourses all empty. Chasing the Monsoon would turn out to be Frater's most popular book, particularly in India, where, by 2016, it still sold hundreds of copies a month.

Frater visited North Korea in the 1990s under the guise of being a teacher – journalists not being allowed in. He stayed at the Koryo Hotel, where he was one of only 20 guests despite the building having 45 floors.

In 2008 he published his final book, The Balloon Factory. It focuses on the pioneers of aviation-based at The Balloon Factory in Farnborough.

Television
Frater made several television documentaries.

A BBC and ABC Discovery Series documentary recreating Africa's flying boat journeys from Cairo to Mozambique was filmed in difficult conditions in 1989 aboard a Catalina flying boat. The programme aired in 1990 entitled The Last African Flying Boat.

Monsoon (BBC), about India's monsoonal rainfall event, aired in 1991.

In the Footsteps of Buddha (BBC), 1993.

Personal
Frater had 2 children: Tania, a university administrator, and John, a medical professor at the University of Oxford. He lived in Richmond upon Thames, close to Heathrow Airport, but unlike many residents did not mind being under 'the glide path' and was curious about the details of the aircraft passing above his flat.

In a 2004 interview with The Independent Frater named his worst travel experience as being arrested in Kupang, West Timor by the Indonesian Military and spending three days in prison, in a cell neighbouring a pit with two Komodo dragons. After release he was put under house arrest and then thrown off the island.

Death
Frater died on 1 January 2020, two days before his 83rd birthday and several years after suffering a stroke.

Books
 Frater, A.R. 2008. The Balloon Factory: The Story of the Men Who Built Britain's First Flying Machines. Picador.
 Frater, A.R. 2004. Tales from the Torrid Zone. Vintage Books/Picador.
 Frater, A.R. 1990. Chasing the Monsoon: a Modern Pilgrimage Through India. Picador.
 Frater, A.R. 1986. Beyond the Blue Horizon: On the track of Imperial Airways. Heinemann. 
 Frater, A.R. (ed.) 1984. Great Rivers of the World. Hodder & Stoughton.  
 Frater, A.R. 1983 Stopping-Train Britain. Hodder & Stoughton.

Awards

 BAFTA Award for Best Single Documentary (The Last African Flying Boat)
 British Press Travel Award commendations – 1982 and 1989
 British Press Award Travel Writer of the Year – 1990, 1991 and 1992
 Best Radio Feature Travelex Travel Writers' Awards – 2000
 Overall winner Travelex Travel Writers' Awards – 2000
 Shortlisted Thomas Cook Travel Book of the Year Award, for Monsoon (Br Book Award, McVitie's Prize)

See also
 List of Hatfield College alumni
 List of Durham University people

References

1937 births
2020 deaths
Alumni of Hatfield College, Durham
Australian writers
British male journalists
British travel writers
Durham University Boat Club rowers
People educated at Scotch College, Melbourne
University of Melbourne alumni
University of Perugia alumni